Cheilosia comosa  (Loew 1863), the Prairie blacklet, is a species of syrphid fly observed in across North America. Hoverflies can remain nearly motionless in flight. The adults are also known as flower flies for they are commonly found on flowers from which they get both energy-giving nectar and protein-rich pollen. Larvae when known are plant feeders.

References

Diptera of North America
Hoverflies of North America
Eristalinae
Insects described in 1863